Psychrobacter glacincola is a Gram-negative, oxidase- and catalase-positive, halotolerant, nonmotile bacterium of the genus  Psychrobacter, which was isolated from the anchor ice of  Amery Ice Shelf in Antarctica.
It is strictly oxidative and coccus-shaped; its type strain is ACAM 483T.

References

Further reading

External links
LPSN
Type strain of Psychrobacter glacincola at BacDive -  the Bacterial Diversity Metadatabase

Moraxellaceae
Bacteria described in 2009